Jostin Tellería Alfaro (born 10 April 2003) is a Costa Rican professional footballer who currently plays as a midfielder for CF Intercity.

Career statistics

Club

Notes

Honours

Club
Saprissa
Liga FPD: Clausura 2021

References

2003 births
Living people
Costa Rican footballers
Association football midfielders
Deportivo Saprissa players
Liga FPD players
CF Intercity players